The Viana do Castelo class is a class of offshore patrol vessels planned by and for the Portuguese Navy, as a result of the NPO2000 Project (Portuguese, Navios de Patrulha Oceânica, for Oceanic Patrol Vessels), that are being constructed in the West Sea Shipyard.

Design 
Two of these vessels of the version Navios de Combate à Poluição (NCP) will be fitted with anti-pollution systems — including Fast Oil Recovery systems. These vessels are named after Portuguese coastal cities.

The first vessel, NRP Viana do Castelo (P360), was commissioned on March 2010 after several years of delay. Six additional vessels are planned by the Portuguese Navy as announced in 2016 to be built in 2017 and 2018. June 22, 2018 the Portuguese Prime Minister announced an additional order of 6 Viana do Castelo Class ships( 60 million euros each) to be built at same shipyard over next 6 years along with a multi purpose ship for a total of 500 million  euros. the order for 6 more NPO-2000 was finalized may 25 2021.

Viana do Castelo was temporarily commissioned with an old 40 mm gun, but the Portuguese navy is acquiring two 30 mm Oto Melara Marlin guns for the first two vessels.

Armament 
Armament consists of a 30 mm Oto Melara Marlin, it replaces one 40 mm L/60 turreted gun in the NRP Viana do Castelo, and four mounts to be armed with 2 x 7.62 mm light machine guns and two 12.7mm M2 Browning as well as two launching systems for MK55 Mod 2 mines. The ships are designed to operate automated systems and are equipped with a single Sagem SA Vigy 10 MKIII naval surveillance and observation platform, three water cannons, and two rigid inflatable boats. Each ship is capable of accommodating a Super Lynx MK95 light helicopter.

Ships

See also 
 Portuguese Navy
West Sea Shipyard

References

External links 
 Viana do Castelo Offshore Patrol Vessels Analysis, Área Militar (in Portuguese)
 Navio de Patrulha Oceânica (NPO 2000) , ENVC (in Portuguese).
 Navio de Combate à Poluição (NCP 2000) , ENVC (in Portuguese).
 Viana do Castelo commissioned, Diário de Notícias newspaper (in Portuguese).
http://www.janes.com/article/51922/portugal-to-buy-two-more-opvs, Janes defence (in English).

Patrol ship classes
Patrol vessels of the Portuguese Navy
Ships built in Portugal
Military equipment of Portugal